The district of Argenteuil was a pre-Confederation electoral district in Quebec, Canada. It was established in 1853, under the Union regime of 1841.

Argenteuil was represented by one Member at the Legislative Assembly of the Province of Canada.

Members of Parliament of the Province of Canada
 Sydney Robert Bellingham (1854–1860)
 John Joseph Caldwell Abbott (1860–1867)

See also
Argenteuil (electoral district) 
Argenteuil (provincial electoral district)

Electoral districts of Canada East